Kafayat is a female given name of Muslim origin.

Notable people with the name 
 Kafayat Oyetola, Nigerian humanitarian, philanthropist
 Kafayat Shafau-Ameh, also known as Kaffy, Nigerian dancer
 Abike Kafayat Oluwatoyin Dabiri-Erewa, Nigerian politician

References 

Given names of Nigerian origin